Lyudmila Nikolayevna Gureyeva (12 February 1943 – 4 October 2017) was a Soviet competitive volleyball player and Olympic silver medalist in the 1964 Summer Olympics.

References

External links
 

1943 births
2017 deaths
Soviet women's volleyball players
Olympic volleyball players of the Soviet Union
Volleyball players at the 1964 Summer Olympics
Olympic silver medalists for the Soviet Union
Russian women's volleyball players
Russian people of Ukrainian descent
Olympic medalists in volleyball
Medalists at the 1964 Summer Olympics
Sportspeople from Odesa